The 1983 Italian Grand Prix was a Formula One motor race held at Monza on 11 September 1983. It was the thirteenth race of the 1983 Formula One World Championship.

The 52-lap race was won by Nelson Piquet, driving a Brabham-BMW, with René Arnoux second in a Ferrari and Eddie Cheever third in a Renault. Drivers' Championship leader Alain Prost retired with a turbo failure midway through the race, allowing Piquet and Arnoux to close to within five and two points of him respectively in the championship.

The race saw the occurrence of an unusual incident in the pit lane. After completing a pit stop, Niki Lauda's McLaren-TAG stalled in front of the Brabham garage. The Brabham crew, who were preparing for Nelson Piquet's stop, were joined by team owner and FOCA chief executive Bernie Ecclestone in giving Lauda a push start, to get him back into the race and to clear the area for Piquet. However, the Austrian driver retired shortly after with an electrical failure.

Another incident occurred at the end of the race, when the tifosi ran onto the track to celebrate Arnoux's second place with the cars still going round. Nigel Mansell, running seventh in his Lotus-Renault, slowed down to avoid running over any of the spectators, only to be overtaken by Bruno Giacomelli's Toleman-Hart. Infuriated, Mansell drove the wrong way into the pit lane.

Classification

Qualifying

Race

Championship standings after the race 

Drivers' Championship standings

Constructors' Championship standings

Note: Only the top five positions are included for both sets of standings.

References

Italian Grand Prix
Grand Prix
Italian Grand Prix
Italian Grand Prix